The Creque Marine Railway, formerly the "St Thomas Marine Repair Facility", is an inclined-plane ship railway on Hassel Island, in the bay of Charlotte Amalie off the coast of St. Thomas Island, in the U.S. Virgin Islands. Its site is below Fort Shipley, within Virgin Islands National Park.

History

19th century
The marine railway was constructed in the 1840s by Danish investors, at Little Careening Cove on Hassel Island in the colonial Danish West Indies. It entered commercial service in 1844. It is probably the world's oldest surviving marine railway.

A large ship-cradle, built out of "greenheart" wood, ran on four rails, down a shallow incline into the water; the cradle was ballasted. A ship could be floated into the cradle, then drawn up the railway by a winch so that work could be done on the hull - or propellers - of the ship on dry land. The winch was driven by a beam engine.

The beam engine and winch mechanism were manufactured by Boulton of Hamburg, around 1840.

20th century
The marine railway was originally called the "St Thomas Marine Repair Facility". It fell into financial difficulties and was auctioned in 1910. It was bought by Henry Creque, who refurbished it. By 1912, the site was back in working order under the name Creque's Maritime Railway Dock.  Under new ownership, the business succeeded again.  The Creque Marine Railway continued service into the 1960s.

During World War II, the U.S. military utilized Hassel Island including Creque Marine Railway and Careening Cove.

The site was fully abandoned in the 1960s.  In 1978 a large part of Hassel Island was donated to the U.S. Department of the Interior as part of the Virgin Islands National Park.

21st century
Hassel Island is accessible to the public by boat from mainland St. Thomas. 

Hiking trails follow the historic routes on the island, passing Fort Shipley, the Creque Marine Railway, Hamburg American Line coaling station, West Indies headquarters of the Royal Mail Steam Packet Company, and other historic sites.  

In 2006 the St. Thomas Historical Trust entered into a Memorandum of Understanding with Virgin Islands National Park, to repair, rehabilitate, and restore structures and areas on Hassel Island.

See also
Hassel Island, U.S. Virgin Islands
Railway transportation in the United States Virgin Islands
 (1754−1917)
National Register of Historic Places listings in the United States Virgin Islands

References

External links

Hassel Island.org: Creque Marine Railway
Hassel Island.org: Danish colonial island history during the 17th and 18th centuries

Docks (maritime)
Transportation in the United States Virgin Islands
Buildings and structures in the Danish West Indies
Virgin Islands National Park
Railway lines opened in 1844
1840s establishments in Denmark
Historic American Engineering Record in the United States Virgin Islands
1840s establishments in the Caribbean